Pimjai Juklin (born 1969), known by her pen name Duanwad Pimwana, is a Thai novelist, poet and journalist. The winner of the 2003 S.E.A Write Award for her novel Changsamran, she is one of Thailand's best-known writers.

Biography 
Born to a family of farmers, she attended a vocational school and worked as a journalist at a local newspaper. She published her first short story at the age of twenty and quickly gained recognition, earning awards from PEN International Thailand and the Thai literary magazine Chorkaraket. She currently lives in her native seaside province of Chonburi, located on the Thai east coast.

Pimwana's Arid Dreams, Pimwana's debut in English translation, is a collection of short stories that explores the daily lives of ordinary Thais.

Reception
Lily Meyer at NPR writes:Duanwad Pimwana is one of Thailand's preeminent female writers. She's beloved for her writing across forms, but especially acclaimed for her short fiction, translated for the first time in the excellent 13-story sampler Arid Dreams....[Her] skill at creating multiplicity makes her mastery clear. Each of her stories poses its own moral challenge, pleasurable and unsettling at once. Taken together, they are a phenomenal puzzle to read.

Selected works 
in English translation
Arid Dreams (2019). Translated by Mui Poopoksakul. New York: Feminist Press.
Bright (2019). Translated by Mui Poopoksakul. San Francisco: Two Lines Press.

References

External links 
 "Monopoly" Short story by Duanwad Pimwana. Words Without Borders, November 2016.
"In Conversation: Duanwad Pimwana, author of Bright and Arid Dreams." Interview with author at Asymptote Journal, May 22, 2019.
"The PEN Ten: An Interview in Translation with Duanwad Pimwana." by Lily Philpott, trans. Mui Poopoksakul. PEN America website, 8 August 2019.

1969 births
Living people
Duanwad Pimwana
Duanwad Pimwana
Duanwad Pimwana
Duanwad Pimwana
Duanwad Pimwana
Duanwad Pimwana
Duanwad Pimwana
Duanwad Pimwana
Duanwad Pimwana
Pseudonymous women writers
Duanwad Pimwana
Duanwad Pimwana
20th-century poets
21st-century poets
20th-century novelists
21st-century novelists
20th-century short story writers
21st-century short story writers
20th-century journalists
21st-century journalists
20th-century pseudonymous writers
21st-century pseudonymous writers